The Suite on Verses of Michelangelo Buonarroti (Сюита на слова Микеланджело Буонарроти, Op.145, 1974) is a cycle of song settings by Dmitri Shostakovich of eleven poems by Michelangelo Buonarroti, translated into the Russian language by Avram Efros (ru). The original version (Op.145) is for bass voice and piano; the composer also produced an orchestrated version (145a).

Shostakovich started work on the songs after coming across Efros' recently published volume of the poems. Shostakovich was dissatisfied with Efros' translations and privately asked the poet Andrei Voznesensky to see about making some new translations. Nevertheless it was premiered, using Efros' texts, on 23 December 1974 in Leningrad by the bass Yevgeny Nesterenko and pianist Yevgeny Shenderovich.

During rehearsals for the orchestral version, Opus 145a, in October 1975, Maxim Shostakovich disclosed to Yevgeni Nesterenko that his father considered this composition took the place of the Sixteenth Symphony in his oeuvre.

Selected recordings

The piano version is less recorded. The original performers Yevgeny Nesterenko and Yevgeny Shenderovich made the first recording for Melodiya. Later recordings include Fyodor Kuznetsov, Yuri Serov (Delos), and John Shirley-Quirk.

The orchestral version, Op. 145a, has been recorded several times, including the first by Yevgeny Nesterenko, with the USSR State TV and Radio Symphony Orchestra, under Maxim Shostakovich (Melodiya С10-07395-6), then Anatoli Kotcherga, Kölner Rundfunk-Sinfonie-Orchester, Michail Jurowski (Capriccio), Robert Holl with the Orchestre National des Pays de Loire, Isaac Karabtchevsky (Calliope), Hermann Christian Polster with the Berlin Radio Symphony Orchestra, Thomas Sanderling (Berlin Classics), Ildar Abdrazakov, with the BBC Philharmonic, under Gianandrea Noseda (Chandos).

See also
List of compositions by Dmitri Shostakovich#Vocal

References

Verses of Michelangelo Buonarroti
Song cycles by Dmitri Shostakovich
1974 compositions
Classical song cycles in Russian
Cultural depictions of Michelangelo